Pyrausta furvicoloralis is a moth in the family Crambidae. It was described by George Hampson in 1900. It is found in Amur, Russia.

References

Moths described in 1900
furvicoloralis
Moths of Asia